Ichthyophis garoensis, the Garo Hills caecilian, is a species of caecilian found in Assam and Meghalaya in north-eastern India. The Husain's caecilian Ichthyophis husaini was until 2016 considered a separate species. It is a subterranean caecilian that lives in the moist leaf-litter of tropical forests. It is typically found close to streams and other waterbodies.

References

garoensis
Amphibians described in 1999
Endemic fauna of India
Amphibians of India